2010 Latvian First League is the 19th season of top-tier football in Latvia. It began on 1 May 2010 and will end with the last games on 6 November 2010.

League table

Results

Top goalscorers

17 goals
 Dāvis Ikaunieks (Liepājas Metalurgs-2)

15 goals
 Vjačeslavs Seleckis (Jūrmala)

13 goals
 Ruslans Agafonovs (FK Daugava/RFS)

12 goals
 Vladimirs Kamešs (Gulbene)

11 goals
 Ivans Sputajs (Gulbene)
 Maksims Daņilovs (Jūrmala)

10 goals
 Minori Sato (Gulbene)

* Players in italics left the clubs they are listed in during the season.

External links
 Official site of Latvian Football Federation

Latvian First League seasons
2
Latvia
Latvia